I'm Free is the sixth album by guitarist/singer/songwriter Ray Parker Jr. He made a comeback after 15 years of absence with this album released from his own independent record company called "Raydio Music Inc.". The record was released in 2006 and included the song "Mexico".

Track listing

References

External links
 
 Ray Parker Jr. at Discogs
 Official Website 
 Facebook Page
 MySpace Page
 Soulwalking page
 Ray Parker Jr 2012 Audio Interview at Soulinterviews.com

2006 albums
Ray Parker Jr. albums
Albums produced by Ray Parker Jr.